Charles Fox (17 March 1897, in London – 30 April 1977, in Montreal) was the English mathematician who introduced the Fox–Wright function and the Fox H-function. In 1976, he received an honorary doctorate from Concordia University.

References

External links
http://www.materialtexts.bbk.ac.uk/?p=343
Charles Fox at the MacTutor History of Mathematics archive

Canadian mathematicians
1977 deaths
1897 births